Cyclophora coenosata is a moth in the  family Geometridae. It is found in Peru.

References

Moths described in 1907
Cyclophora (moth)
Moths of South America